Torredembarra, normally called La Torre by its inhabitants, is a town in the comarca of the Tarragonès, in the province of Tarragona, Catalonia, Spain. It is located on the Costa Daurada, it faces Altafulla to the west, La Pobla de Montornès to the north, Creixell to the east and Mediterranean Sea in the south. It is 13 km to Tarragona's northeast and about 100 km southwest Barcelona.

The GR 92 long distance footpath, which roughly follows the length of the Mediterranean coast of Spain, has a staging point at Torredembarra.

Twin towns
 Villars, France
 Halberstadt, Germany

References

External links 
Guia comercial de la Vila de Torredembarra
 Government data pages 
 Torredembarra – The jewel of Costa Daurada

Latest news 
In 9th Agust 2022 a flat in Alt de Sant Pere str. 47A bloc burnt down belonging to a Bulgarian family.The Kichevs.

Municipalities in Tarragonès
Populated places in Tarragonès
Seaside resorts in Spain